Miss Venezuela 2006 was the 53rd Miss Venezuela pageant, was held in Caracas, Venezuela, on September 14, 2006, after weeks of events. The winner of the pageant was Ly Jonaitis, Miss Guárico.

The pageant was broadcast live on Venevision from the Poliedro de Caracas in Caracas, Venezuela. At the conclusion of the final night of competition, outgoing titleholder Jictzad Viña crowned Ly Jonaitis of Guárico as the new Miss Venezuela.

Results

Special awards
 Miss Photogenic (voted by press reporters) - Bárbara Sánchez (Miss Amazonas)
 Miss Internet (voted by www.missvenezuela.com viewers) - Joshil Morales (Miss Aragua)
 Miss Congeniality (voted by Miss Venezuela contestants) - Marygrey Quero (Miss Costa Oriental)
 Miss Personality - Vanessa Peretti (Miss Sucre)
 Best Body - Andreina Bruni (Miss Distrito Capital)
 Best Smile - Silvana Marando (Miss Miranda)
 Miss Beauty - Ly Jonaitis (Miss Guárico)
 Miss Elegance - Claudia Suárez (Miss Mérida)
 Best Face - Ly Jonaitis (Miss Guárico)

Delegates
The Miss Venezuela 2006 delegates are:

Notes
Ly Jonaitis placed as 2nd runner-up in Miss Universe 2007 in Mexico City, Mexico and Miss Interamericana 2008 in Dominican Republic
Claudia Suárez placed as semifinalist in Miss World 2007 in Sanya, China. She also placed as 2nd runner up in Miss Atlántico Internacional 2008 in Punta del Este, Uruguay.
Vanessa Peretti placed as semifinalist in Miss International 2007 in Tokyo, Japan. Peretti was the first deaf woman to compete in the Miss Venezuela pageant. She competed in Miss International 2007 on October 15 in Japan against another deaf woman, Sophie Vouzelaud from France. Peretti classified in Top 15 semifinalists. It is the first time in the history of Miss International that two deaf contestants participated in the event.
Silvana Marando placed as a semifinalist in Miss Italia Nel Mondo 2010 pageant, held in Jesolo, Italy.
Mónica Pallotta placed as semifinalist in Top Model of the World 2006 in Kunming, China. She previously placed as semifinalist in Miss Italia Nel Mondo 2005 in Salsomaggiore, Italy.
Francis Lugo placed as 1st runner up in Miss Continente Americano 2007 in Guayaquil, Ecuador.
María Daniela Torrealba placed as finalist in Miss Earth 2008 in Pampanga, Philippines.
Patricia Jurado-Blanco placed as finalist in Miss Global Beauty Queen 2007 in Ningbo, China.
Sara Angelini placed as a semifinalist in Miss Italia Nel Mondo 2010 pageant, held in Jesolo, Italy.

References

External links
Miss Venezuela official website

2006 in Venezuela
2006 beauty pageants